A court of first instance is a trial court of original or primary jurisdiction.

Specific courts by that name include:
 Tribunal of first instance (Belgium)
 Court of First Instance (France)
 Court of First Instance (Hong Kong)
Courts of First Instance of Peru

See also
 General Court (European Union), known before the 2009 Treaty of Lisbon as the Court of First Instance
 Regional Trial Court of the Philippines, formerly the Court of First Instance